Yizhi Jane Tao, Ph.D., is a Chinese biochemist, structural biologist, and Professor of Biochemistry and Cell Biology at Rice University in Houston, Texas.  Professor Tao led a team of researchers to be the first to map the structure of the influenza A virus nucleoprotein to an atomic level, a feat which circulated widely in the popular press. She was named among the top ten most influential Chinese of 2006 by a consortium of China's leading media outlets including Phoenix Satellite Television, China News Service, Asia Newsweek, and World Journal.

Education 

Born in China, Yizhi Jane Tao received a B.Sc. degree in biology from Peking University in Beijing, China, in 1992.  She later moved to West Lafayette, Indiana, where she received her Ph.D. in biological science while studying under the German-American biophysicist Michael Rossmann.  She completed a postdoctoral fellowship under Stephen C. Harrison at Harvard University in 2002.  Upon completing her postdoctoral studies, Tao joined the faculty of Rice University, where she has made important contributions to the study of influenza, hepatitis, and birnaviruses.

See also
 Timeline of women in science

References

The mechanism by which influenza A virus nucleoprotein forms oligomers and binds RNA

External links
 Yizhi Jane Tao Faculty Detail
The structure of a birnavirus polymerase reveals a distinct active site topology in Proceedings of the National Academy of Sciences of the United States of America magazine.
Structure of the hepatitis E virus-like particle suggests mechanisms for virus assembly and receptor binding in Proceedings of the National Academy of Sciences of the United States of America magazine.

Year of birth missing (living people)
Living people
Chinese emigrants to the United States
Purdue University alumni
Harvard University staff
Rice University faculty
Chinese biochemists
Chinese women chemists
American women biologists
Women biochemists
21st-century American women scientists
Chinese women biologists
American women chemists
Peking University alumni
American women academics